Erik de Bruyn (born 27 October 1962) is a Dutch film director and actor. His 2000 film Wild Mussels was entered into the 23rd Moscow International Film Festival.

Selected filmography
 Mates (1999)
 Wild Mussels (2000)
 J. Kessels (2016)

References

External links

1962 births
Living people
Dutch film directors
Dutch male film actors
People from Terneuzen
20th-century Dutch people